or  is the administrative centre of Evenes Municipality in Nordland county, Norway. The European route E10 highway passes through the village. Bogen Chapel is located in this village.

Historically, Bogen is most notable for small-scale iron ore mining in the early 20th century as well as being a German naval base during World War II, including for the German battleship Tirpitz and the heavy cruiser Admiral Hipper.

Media gallery

References

Evenes
Villages in Nordland
Populated places of Arctic Norway